The Hurkalo waterfall is located on the Velyka Richka River,  south-west of Korchyn, Stryi Raion, Lviv Oblast of western Ukraine.

See also
 Waterfalls of Ukraine

References 

Waterfalls of Ukraine